The Chatham rail (Cabalus modestus) is an extinct flightless species of bird in the family Rallidae. It was endemic to Chatham, Mangere and Pitt Islands, in the Chatham archipelago of New Zealand.

The Chatham rail and the Dieffenbach's rail, both flightless, were sympatric on the Chatham Islands. Their sympatry suggests parallel evolution after separate colonisation of the Chatham Islands by a common volant ancestor. A genetic analysis from 1997 suggested that the two were sister taxa. However more recent genetic analysis finds them to not be closely related within the Gallirallus radition, with a 2014 analysis finding the Chatham rail being sister taxon to the New Caledonian rail instead.

The Chatham rail was first discovered on Mangere in 1871, and 26 specimens collected there are known from museum collections. It became extinct on the island between 1896 and 1900. The species is also known from 19th century bones from Chatham and Pitt Islands. It is likely to have occurred in scrubland and tussock grass.

Extinction
Its extinction was presumably caused by predation by rats and cats (which were introduced in the 1890s), habitat destruction to provide sheep pasture (which destroyed all the island's bush and tussock grass by 1900), and from grazing by goats and rabbits. On Chatham and Pitt Islands, Olson has suggested that its extinction resulted from competition with the larger Dieffenbach's rail (also extinct), but this has been refuted later when the two species have been shown to have been sympatric on Mangere.

See also 

 Hawkins's rail another extinct flightless rail endemic to the Chatham Islands.

References

External links

Specimens from the Museum of New Zealand Te Papa Tongarewa.
Specimens from the Auckland War Memorial Museum Tāmaki Paenga Hira

Cabalus
Bird extinctions since 1500
Extinct birds of the Chatham Islands
Taxa named by Frederick Hutton (scientist)
Birds described in 1872
Taxonomy articles created by Polbot